Diplomatic Academy may refer to:

 Diplomatic Academy (Czech Republic)
 Diplomatic Academy (United Kingdom)
 Diplomatic Academy of London (defunct)
 Diplomatic Academy of the Ministry of Foreign Affairs of the Russian Federation
 Diplomatic Academy of Vienna
 Diplomatic Academy of Vietnam